The 1842 State of the Union Address, was written by John Tyler, the tenth president of the United States.  It was presented on Tuesday, December 6, 1842, by the Clerk of the United States House of Representatives.  He said, "We have continued reason to express our profound gratitude to the Great Creator of All Things for numberless benefits conferred upon us as a people. Blessed with genial seasons, the husbandman has his garners filled with abundance, and the necessaries of life, not to speak of its luxuries, abound in every direction."

References

State of the Union addresses
Presidency of John Tyler
27th United States Congress
State of the Union Address
State of the Union Address
State of the Union Address
State of the Union Address
December 1842 events
State of the Union